Twitty is a surname. Notable people with the name include:

Beth Holloway-Twitty (born c. 1961), American speech pathologist and motivational speaker
Conway Twitty (1933–1993), American country music singer
Howard Twitty (born 1949), American professional golfer
Jasmine Twitty (born 1989), African-American municipal judge and youngest judge in American history
Jeff Twitty (born 1957), American baseball player 
Michael W. Twitty (born 1977), African-American Jewish writer, culinary historian, and educator
Panthea Twitty (1912–1977), American photographer, ceramist, and historian
Pat Twitty, American songwriter who wrote an enduring jingle for Martha White flour in 1953
Stephen Twitty (born 1963), United States Army Lieutenant General
Victor C. Twitty (1901–1967), American biologist

Fictional characters 
Alan Twitty, a character in Even Stevens, an American TV series
Eleanor Twitty, a character in the Ghostbusters universe

See also
Tweedy (disambiguation)
Tweety (disambiguation)